The Eye of the Storm is a 1970 American television documentary featuring schoolteacher Jane Elliott conducting her "Blue Eyes/Brown Eyes" exercise in discrimination, in her third-grade classroom at Riceville Elementary School in Riceville, Iowa. Riceville, a small town near the Minnesota border, is almost entirely white; in that context, young children had little understanding of the concept of discrimination. The documentary is narrated by Bill Beutel and directed by William Peters.

Premise
William Peters follows Jane Elliott's  schoolroom exercise, conducted over two consecutive days, during which an otherwise homogenous group of elementary school kids was divided by their eye color. On the first day, members of one group were favored and thus received deferential, even preferential, treatment all day. Meanwhile, the members of the other group were disfavored; their treatment was a reflection of that. On the second day, the roles were reversed.

Follow-up
This documentary was followed up with "A Class Divided", a 1985 Frontline episode in which The Eye of the Storm is shown to the original participating students—now adults 15 years later—and Elliott is given a chance to find out how much of the lesson her students retained.

References

External links
 

1970 films
American documentary television films
1970s short documentary films
Documentary films about racism
Peabody Award-winning broadcasts
Documentary films about psychology
1970s English-language films
1970s American films